Abrupt Island, also known as Brattöy, is an island  across, lying  east of Lang Island, east of the Øygarden Group and Edward VIII Bay. Mapped by Norwegian cartographers from aerial photos taken by the Lars Christensen Expedition, 1936–37, and called Brattoy ("abrupt island"). The Norwegian name was translated by ANCA following a 1954 ANARE (Australian National Antarctic Research Expeditions) survey of the area.

See also 
 List of Antarctic and sub-Antarctic islands

Islands of Kemp Land